The large-footed bat, large-footed mouse-eared bat, or large-footed myotis (Myotis adversus) is a species of vesper bat (family Vespertilionidae). It can be found in the following countries: Australia, Indonesia, Malaysia, Papua New Guinea, Singapore, Solomon Islands, Taiwan, Vanuatu, and possibly Vietnam.

References

Mouse-eared bats
Bats of Oceania
Bats of Southeast Asia
Bats of Australia
Bats of Indonesia
Bats of Malaysia
Mammals of Papua New Guinea
Mammals of Western New Guinea
Mammals of Singapore
Mammals of Taiwan
Mammals of Western Australia
Mammals of New South Wales
Mammals of Victoria (Australia)
Least concern biota of Asia
Least concern biota of Oceania
Mammals described in 1824
Taxonomy articles created by Polbot
Taxa named by Thomas Horsfield